La Japonaise is the eighth studio album by Japanese recording artist Meg.  It was released on April 25, 2012 through King Records.

Background
With the theme of "songs that connect Japan and France", La Japonaise is Meg's first concept album, consisting only of Japanese anime theme songs. "Discotheque", "Banana no Namida", "Believe", "Rouge no Dengon", "Still Love Her" and "Tough Boy" had been previously released -in that order-, although exclusively in France through iTunes Store under the supervision of Warner Music Japan. Though the singles were released on Warner, this album was released through King Records' sublabel Starchild, making it her first release with the label.

Track listing

References 

2012 albums
Meg (singer) albums